Kolkata Police is divided into nine administrative divisions. Each division is under a Deputy Commissioner of Police.

North and North Suburban Division
With its divisional head office at 113, Acharya Prafulla Chandra Road, Kolkata-700009, the North and North Suburban Division has the following police stations:

Eastern Suburban Division
With its divisional head office at 105, Hem Chandra Naskar Road, Kolkata-700010, the Eastern Suburban Division has the following police stations:

Central Division
With its divisional head office at 138, S.N.Banerjee Road, Kolkata-700013, the Central Division has the following police stations:

South Division
With its divisional head office at 34, Park Street, Kolkata-700016, the South Division has the following police stations:

South East Division
With its divisional head office at Park Court, 2, Syed Amir Ali Avenue, Kolkata-700017, the South East Division has the following police stations:

South Suburban Division
With its divisional head office at  Tollygunge EF Lines, 255/257, D P S Road, Kolkata - 700033, the South Suburban Division has the following police stations:

East Division
With its divisional head office at 50/2, East Rajapur, Kolkata-700075, the East Division has the following police stations:

South West Division
With its divisional head office at Tollygunge EF Lines, 555/557, D P S Road, Kolkata-700033, the South West Division has the following police stations:

Port Division
With its divisional head office at 1, Dumayune Avenue, Kolkata-700043, the South Division has the following police stations:

References

Kolkata Police Force